Albert Edward Stofko (1920-1988) was a professional football player in the National Football League. He graduated from Johnstown Pennsylvania High School and attended Saint Francis University, Loretto, Pennsylvania.

Career
He played in the National Football League for just one season in 1945. Stofko was drafted 85th overall by the "Card-Pitt", a team that was the result of a temporary merger between the Chicago Cardinals and the Pittsburgh Steelers. The teams' merger was a result of the manning shortages experienced league-wide due to World War II. He played for the Pittsburgh Steelers in 1945.

He attempted 17 passes and completed 7 for a 41.2% average. He also punted for a 36.3 yards per punt average.

He died in December 1988

References

External links

     

Sportspeople from Johnstown, Pennsylvania
Players of American football from Pennsylvania
American football defensive backs              
American football halfbacks
1920 births
1988 deaths
Pittsburgh Steelers players
Saint Francis Red Flash football players